Kaduna International Polo Club is one of the oldest polo club in Nigeria. It is located in Kaduna state at the Murtala Ramat Mohammed Square.

History 
It was founded in 1918, the Patron of the club is His Royal Highness Alhaji Abdulmumini Kabir Usman emir of Katsina State, while the current president of the club is Alhaji Suleiman Abubakar (Walin Keffi).
Kaduna Polo club has celebrated its centenary during the 2018 Kaduna Polo Tournament, which took place on 13 to 21 October 2018. The event which was termed as 'Kaduna polo centenary tournament' or 'Tournament as celebration of Legacy' was contested by about forty teams from different states across Nigeria, they included teams from Port Harcourt Polo clubs, Ibadan Polo clubs, Abuja Guards Brigade Polo club, Kano Polo clubs, and Lagos Polo clubs.

Noble prizes 
Among the biggest prizes of the tournament are the Georgian Cup, the Emir of Katsina Cup, and the NAHCON Cup. The Kaduna-based fifth chukker team El-Amin won fourteenth(14th) titles of the Georgian Cup the highest than any other team, while the second highest title owners is the Abuja Rubicon team with 12 titles.

References

1918 establishments in Nigeria
Sports venues completed in 1918
Sports clubs in Kaduna state
Sports venues in Kaduna State
Polo in Nigeria
Polo clubs
Sports clubs in Nigeria
20th-century architecture in Nigeria